A Greek chorus, or simply chorus, in the context of ancient Greek tragedy, comedy, satyr plays, and modern works inspired by them, is a homogeneous, non-individualised group of performers, who comment with a collective voice on the dramatic action.  The chorus consisted of between 12 and 50 players, who variously danced, sang or spoke their lines in unison, and sometimes wore masks.

Etymology
Historian H. D. F. Kitto argues that the term chorus gives us hints about its function in the plays of ancient Greece: "The Greek verb choreuo, 'I am a member of the chorus', has the sense 'I am dancing'. The word ode means not something recited or declaimed, but 'a song'. The 'orchestra', in which a chorus had its being, is literally a 'dancing floor'." From this, it can be inferred that the chorus danced and sang poetry.

Dramatic function
Plays of the ancient Greek theatre always included a chorus that offered a variety of background and summary information to help the audience follow the performance. They commented on themes, and, as August Wilhelm Schlegel proposed in the early 19th century to subsequent controversy, demonstrated how the audience might react to the drama. According to Schlegel, the Chorus is "the ideal spectator", and conveys to the actual spectator "a lyrical and musical expression of his own emotions, and elevates him to the region of contemplation". In many of these plays, the chorus expressed to the audience what the main characters could not say, such as their hidden fears or secrets. The chorus often provided other characters with the insight they needed.

Some historians argue that the chorus was itself considered to be an actor. Scholars have considered Sophocles to be superior to Euripides in his choral writing. Of the two, Sophocles also won more dramatic contests. His chorus passages were more relevant to the plot and more integrated in tragedies, whereas the Euripidean choruses seemingly had little to do with the plot and were often bystanders. Aristotle stated in his Poetics:

The chorus represents, on stage, the general population of the particular story, in sharp contrast with many of the themes of the ancient Greek plays which tended to be about individual heroes, gods, and goddesses.  They were often the same sex as the main character. In Aeschylus' Agamemnon, the chorus comprises the elderly men of Argos, whereas in Euripides' The Bacchae, they are a group of eastern bacchantes, and in Sophocles' Electra, the chorus represents the women of Argos. In Aeschylus' The Eumenides, however, the chorus takes the part of a host of avenging Furies.

In the surviving tragedies, the choruses represent:

Aeschylus:
 Agamemnon - Elders of Argos
 The Eumenides - Furies
 The Libation Bearers - Enslaved Women
 The Persians - Elders of Susa
 Prometheus Bound - Oceanids
 Seven Against Thebes - Theban Women
 The Suppliants - The Danaïdes

Sophocles:
 Ajax - Sailors from Salamis
 Antigone - Elders of Thebes
 Electra - Mycenaean Women
 Oedipus at Colonus - Elders of Colonus
 Oedipus Rex - Elders of Thebae
 Philoctetes - Sailors of Neoptolemus
 Women of Trachis - Trachinian Women

Euripides:
 Alcestis - Elders of Pherae
 Andromache - Phthian Women
 The Bacchae - Theban Maenads
 Children of Heracles - Elders of Athens
 Electra - Argive Women
 Hecuba - Enslaved Trojan Women
 Helen - Enslaved Greek Women in Egypt
 Heracles - Elders of Thebes
 Hippolytus - Troezenian Women, Attendants to Hippolytus
 Ion - Women in the Service of Creusa
 Iphigenia in Aulis - Chalcidian Women
 Iphigenia in Tauris - Enslaved Greek Women in Taurica
 Medea - Corinthian Women
 Orestes - Argive Women
 The Phoenician Women - Phoenician Women
 Rhesus - Trojan Sentinels
 The Suppliants - Mothers and Sons of the Fallen Thebans
 The Trojan Women - Trojan Noble Women

Choral structure and size
The lines of choral odes provide evidence that they were sung. Normal syllabic structure has long sounds that are twice the length of short sounds. However, some lyrics in Greek odes have long syllables that are equal to 3, 4 and 5 shorter syllables. Spoken words cannot do that, suggesting that this was a danced and sung rhythm.

The chorus originally consisted of fifty members, but some later playwrights changed the size. Aeschylus likely lowered the number to twelve, and Sophocles raised it again to fifteen. Fifteen members were used by Euripides and Sophocles in tragedies. The chorus stood in the orchestra. There were twenty-four members in comedies.

Stage management
The chorus performed using several techniques, including singing, dancing, narrating, and acting. There is evidence that there were strong rhythmic components to their speaking.

They often communicated in song form, but sometimes spoke their lines in unison. The chorus had to work in unison to help explain the play as there were only one to three actors on stage who were already playing several parts each. As the Greek theatres were so large, the chorus' actions had to be exaggerated and their voices clear so that everyone could see and hear them. To do this, they used techniques such as synchronization, echo, ripple, physical theatre and the use of masks to aid them. A Greek chorus was often led by a coryphaeus. They also served as the ancient equivalent for a curtain, as their parodos (entering procession) signified the beginnings of a play and their exodos (exit procession) served as the curtains closing.

Decline in antiquity
Before the introduction of multiple, interacting actors by Aeschylus, the Greek chorus was the main performer in relation to a solitary actor. The importance of the chorus declined after the 5th century BCE, when the chorus began to be separated from the dramatic action. Later dramatists depended on the chorus less than their predecessors. As dialogue and characterization became more important, the chorus made less of an appearance. However, historian Alan Hughes argues that there was no such thing as decline, but rather the slow dissolution of one form into another:

Modern choruses
Musical theatre and grand opera sometimes incorporate a singing chorus that serves a similar purpose as the Greek chorus, as noted in Six Plays by Rodgers and Hammerstein: "The singing chorus is used frequently to interpret the mental and emotional reactions of the principal characters, after the manner of a Greek chorus."

During the Italian Renaissance, there was a renewed interest in the theatre of ancient Greece. The Florentine Camerata crafted the first operas out of the intermezzi that acted as comic or musical relief during the dramas of the time. These were based entirely on the Greek chorus, as historian H.C. Montgomery argues.

Richard Wagner discussed Greek drama and the Greek chorus extensively in his writings, including "Art and Revolution". His longest work, Der Ring des Nibelungen, (The Ring of the Nibelung) is based in the style of Oresteia with parallels in rhythm and overall structure (both have three parts, with the exception of Das Rheingold, the prelude to The Ring of the Nibelung). Wagner said of himself, "History gave me a model also for that ideal relation of the theater to the public which I had in mind. I found it in the drama of Ancient Athens". A Greek chorus is also used in the Woody Allen film Mighty Aphrodite, in which the chorus gives advice to the neurotic main character.

See also 
 Chorus of the elderly in classical Greek drama

References

Further reading
 Billings, Joshua H., Felix Budelmann, and Fiona Macintosh, eds. 2013. Choruses Ancient and Modern. Oxford: Oxford Univ. Press.
 Brockett, Oscar G. and Franklin J. Hildy. 2003. History of the Theatre. Ninth edition, International edition. Boston: Allyn and Bacon. .
 Calame, Claude; (tr. Derek Collins & Janice Orion), "Choruses of Young Women in Ancient Greece: Their Morphology, Religious Role, and Social Functions", Rowman & Littlefield, 2001. 
 
 Dhuga, Umit Singh. 2011. "Choral Identity and the Chorus of Elders in Greek Tragedy. Lanham, MD: Rowman & Littlefield.
 Haigh, Arthur Elam, The Attic Theatre: A Description of the Stage and Theatre of the Athenians, and of the Dramatic Performances at Athens, Oxford: The Clarendon Press, 1898.
 Foley, Helene P. 2003. "Choral Identity in Greek Tragedy." Classical Philology 98.1: 1–30.
 Henrichs, Albert. 1994–1995. "“Why Should I Dance?”: Choral Self-Referentiality in Greek Tragedy." Arion 3.1: 56–111.
 Kitto, H. D. F., The Greeks, 1952.
 Murnaghan, Sheila. 2011. "Choroi Achoroi: The Athenian Politics of Tragic Choral Identity." In Why Athens?: A Reappraisal of Tragic Politics. Edited by David M. Carter, 245–268. Oxford, New York: Oxford Univ. Press.
 Pavis, Patrice. 1998. Dictionary of the Theatre: Terms, Concepts, and Analysis. Trans. Christine Shantz. Toronto and Buffalo: U of Toronto P. .
 Rehm, Rush. 1992. Greek Tragic Theatre. Theatre Production Studies ser. London and New York: Routledge. .

External links

 
The Chorus at TheatreHistory.com

Ancient Greek theatre
Stock characters in ancient Greek comedy